Federated States of Micronesia competed at the 2019 Pacific Games in Apia, Samoa from 7 to 20 July 2019. The country participated in five sports at the 2019 games.

Athletics

Boxing

FSM has nominated one athlete to compete in boxing at the 2019 games.

Women
 Jennifer Chieng

Outrigger canoeing

Tennis

Two players were nominated to compete in tennis at the 2019 games.

Men
 Asher Johnson
 George Jones

Volleyball

References

Nations at the 2019 Pacific Games
2019